Az-Zubair Prize for Innovation and Scientific Excellence is an annual Sudanese scientific prize awarded by the President of Sudan for scientific innovation and creativity in applied and technological fields.

History 
On November 7, 1998, President Omer Al-Bashir passed a bill to establish an annual scientific award for innovation and scientific excellence that commemorate General Az-Zubair Mohammed Salih, former Sudan's vice president who died in an aeroplane crash. The award is governed by the Association for the Promotion of Scientific Innovation (APSI), a specialized organization that was established by General Az-Zubair for sponsoring technological advances and scientific research.

Prize types 
The prize is divided onto two major levels:

 Special Honorary Prize - awarded for individuals who had great distinctive works and great scientific position that majorly contributed to the society.
 Competitors level is divided onto three sub-categories:
 Scientific level - open to higher certificate holders and researchers
 Youth level - open to students and graduates of universities and higher institutions
 Talented level - open to anyone that presents valuable and empirical invention or creative work that reflects talent and excellence and has a great value for the society

Prize fields 
The general fields of the Az-Zubair Prize are:
 Islamic Studies
 Medical and Health Sciences
 Engineering and Mathematical Sciences
 Computer Science and Information Technology
 Agriculture
 Veterinary and Animal production.
 Economics and Administrative Sciences
 Natural Sciences
 Liberal Arts
 Behavioural sciences

Award 
The prize award is composed of:
 A medallion of science, awarded by the President of Sudan
 Scientific patent bearing the name of the winner and abstract for winning
 Monetary award of SDD20 million Sudanese dinar (equivalent to $90,000) distributed among the winners

Recipients
 2000 Awn Alsharif Qasim
 2000 Ahmed Hassan Fahal 
 2003 El Hadi Ahmed El Sheikh

External links 
 APSI Official website (Arabic Portal)

Science and technology awards
Science and technology in Sudan
Society of Sudan
Awards established in 1998
Orders, decorations, and medals of Sudan